Helidon may refer to:

 Helidon, Queensland, town in Lockyer Valley, Queensland, Australia
 Helidon railway station, serving the town of Helidon on the Main line in Queensland, Australia
 , a music label in Ljubljana, Slovenia
Helidon Gjergji (born 1970), Albanian artist
Helidon Xhixha (born 1970), Albanian artist

Albanian masculine given names